Tony Taylor (born July 21, 1984) is a former American football linebacker. He was signed by the Atlanta Falcons as an undrafted free agent in 2007. He played college football at Georgia.

Taylor was also a member of the Seattle Seahawks and the Virginia Destroyers of the United Football League.

College career
Taylor had a very good senior season at the University of Georgia. He was named the MVP for the 2006 Georgia Bulldogs team after leading the team in tackles and also earned the Chick-fil-A Bowl Defensive MVP award after he helped his team to a bowl victory with 2 interceptions and 10 tackles. Taylor also played in the 2004 U.S. Army All American bowl with future college teammate Charles Johnson.

Professional career

Atlanta Falcons
Taylor was signed as an undrafted free agent by the Atlanta Falcons after the 2007 NFL Draft. He earned a spot on the active roster for the 2007 NFL season with the Falcons but did not make any starts and got most of his playing time on special teams.
Taylor was released by the Falcons on September 1, 2008.

Seattle Seahawks
On May 21, 2009, Taylor was signed to a one-year contract as an unrestricted free agent by the Seattle Seahawks. He was waived/injured on August 5 and reverted to injured reserve. However, he was released with an injury settlement on August 11.

Saskatchewan Roughriders

On March 8, 2012, Taylor signed with the Saskatchewan Roughriders of the Canadian Football League. On May 18, 2012, he was released.

References

External links
Just Sports Stats
Saskatchewan Roughriders bio
Seattle Seahawks bio

1984 births
Living people
Players of American football from Georgia (U.S. state)
American football linebackers
Georgia Bulldogs football players
Atlanta Falcons players
Seattle Seahawks players
Virginia Destroyers players
Saskatchewan Roughriders players
People from Watkinsville, Georgia